Sabrynaah Pope (October 6, 1959 - September 24, 2005) was a female house-music vocalist from Brooklyn, New York. She was well known for her work with house acts 95 North, DJ Pierre, and as part of U.D.A.U.F.L., which scored a number-one track on the Billboard Hot Dance Music/Club Play chart with "Most Precious Love" in 2005. She also contributed her vocals to "Keep Hope Alive," which was featured on the group's 2004 album of the same name. Pope died soon after at her New York home.

References

External links

2003 interview

1959 births
2005 deaths
American women singers
American house musicians
American dance musicians
American women in electronic music
20th-century American women
21st-century American women